List of competitors inducted into the Brazilian jiu-jitsu Hall of Fame by the International Brazilian Jiu-Jitsu Federation (IBJJF), the sport's governing body. The list consists of athletes who have either achieved incredible results throughout their competitive careers (at least 4 world titles), or made genuine, far-ranging impact upon the sport and art of jiu-jitsu.

Inductees

Female 
Source

 Luanna Alzuguir, (2014⁠)
 ⁠⁠Bianca Andrade, (2014⁠)
 Gabi Garcia, (2014⁠)
 Kyra Gracie, (2014⁠)
 Beatriz Mesquita, (2022)
 Michelle Nicolini, (2014⁠)
 Leticia Ribeiro, (2014⁠)
 Hannette Staack, (2014⁠)

Male 
Source

  Marcus Almeida, (2014⁠)
  Romulo Barral, (2014⁠)
  Romero Cavalcanti, (2016⁠)
  Bernardo Faria, (2022)
  André Galvão, (2022)
  Marcelo Garcia, (2014⁠)
  Carlos Gracie Jr., (2016⁠)
  Carlson Gracie, (2016⁠)
  Roger Gracie, (2014⁠)
  Rolls Gracie, (2016⁠)
  Royler Gracie, (2014⁠)
  Fábio Gurgel, (2014⁠)
  Lucas Lepri, (2022)
  Rubens Charles Maciel, (2014⁠)
  Roberto Magalhães, (2014⁠)
  Bruno Malfacine, (2014⁠)
  Guilherme Mendes, (2022)
  Rafael Mendes, (2022)
  Robson Moura, (2014⁠)
  Alexandre Ribeiro, (2014⁠)
  Saulo Ribeiro, (2014⁠)
  Rodolfo Vieira, (2014⁠)

See also
 World Jiu-Jitsu Championship

References

External links 
 IBJJF 2016 Awards & Hall of Fame

Brazilian jiu-jitsu people